Buddy is an animated cartoon character in the Looney Tunes series by Leon Schlesinger Productions. He was the second star of the series, after Bosko.

Looney Tunes
Buddy has his origins in the chaos that followed after animators Hugh Harman and Rudy Ising severed their relations with producer Leon Schlesinger. Without his animators and Bosko the Talk-Ink Kid, the star character they had taken with them, Schlesinger was desperate to build his own cartoon studio and maintain his contract with Warner Bros. He lured in several animators from other studios, among them Earl Duvall from Disney. Schlesinger told his new employees to create a star character for the studio, and Duvall created Buddy in 1933, with his first film Buddy's Day Out released on September 9.

The character had a troubled beginning, as Warner Bros. refused to accept his first two cartoons, resulting in Friz Freleng being called in to re-edit and condense them into a single short. In the book Of Mice and Magic: A History of American Animated Cartoons, animator Bob Clampett is quoted as describing Buddy as "Bosko in whiteface". Despite these initial problems, Buddy would go on to be the studio's linchpin character for the next two years.

Music dominates in Buddy's world. The characters add visuals to the soundtrack and participate in gags. Buddy is usually accompanied in his films by his flapper girlfriend, Cookie, and his dog, Towser. The character would go on to star in 23 short films from 1933 to 1935, before he was retired to make way for a new character called Beans the Cat. Beans became the third Looney Tunes star, though later on replaced by the more popular Porky Pig. Buddy's voice was most of the time performed by animator Jack Carr.

Buddy had various designs throughout the course of his career. In Buddy's Beer Garden, he wore a jacket with a small bow tie and long pants. After Warner Bros. rejected the short, animator Tom Palmer redesigned the character into a younger boy with trousers, a polo shirt, and a large cap, as seen in Buddy's Day Out. Because Tom Palmer was fired, the early design of Buddy was reused for Buddy's Showboat. Friz Freleng gave the character another design, which was nearly identical to Earl Duvall's except he is smaller and does not wear a jacket. Ben Hardaway later redesigned Buddy to look more like his predecessor, Bosko.

Reception
In recent decades, Buddy has received negative reviews, and is often considered the worst character in the Looney Tunes franchise. In That's All, Folks! The Art of Warner Bros. Animation, Steve Schneider describes Buddy as "a creature of limitless blandness," and calls Buddy's Day Out "a nondescript adventure spree." Schneider says that "probably the best of the run is his farewell film, Buddy the Gee Man", but "about the most that can be said for Buddy is that he is distinctly forgettable."

Filmography

Mr. and Mrs. Is the Name
The 1935 Merrie Melodies cartoon Mr. and Mrs. Is the Name, in which mermaid characters resembling Buddy and Cookie find a treasure trove, was Buddy's first color appearance; however, whether the short should be considered official is in doubt, as the characters are not named.

Modern appearances
Buddy's first (and so far only) new appearance after his original series ended came in the 1993 animated series Animaniacs, where he appeared in the episode "The Warners' 65th Anniversary Special" as the main antagonist of that episode. It was broadcast on May 23, 1994. In this episode, it was revealed (in the series' fictional history) that Yakko, Wakko, and Dot were created to spice up Buddy's dull cartoons; these series of Buddy-Warner shorts mainly consisted of the Warners smashing Buddy on the head with mallets. After Buddy was dropped by the studio in favor of the Warners, Buddy retired to become a nut farmer in Ojai, California, but hated the Warners for ruining his career, and made a failed attempt at the Anniversary Special to enact revenge on the Warner Siblings for ruining his career 65 years ago. Jim Cummings provided Buddy's voice here. The cartoons he starred in with the Warners shown were Outback Buddy, Postman Buddy, Gardening Buddy, Baker Buddy, and Busdriver Buddy (all were dated from the main Bosko until the early Buddy years).

On the PBS series History Detectives, a collection of Buddy cels from Buddy's first appearance Buddy's Day Out is the focus of a 2010 episode.

References

External links
Too Looney!: Buddy Profile

Animated human characters
Looney Tunes characters
Film characters introduced in 1933